Nycteribiidae is a family of the true fly superfamily Hippoboscoidea are known as "bat flies", together with their close relatives the Streblidae. As the latter do not seem to be a monophyletic group, it is conceivable that bat flies cannot be united into a single family.

They are flattened, spiderlike flies without eyes or wings, and as such bear very little resemblance to other Dipterans. These flies are seldom encountered by general collectors, as they almost never leave the bodies of their hosts. Both males and females take blood meals, thus they qualify as real parasites. Most species are highly host-specific. The family is primarily found in the Old World tropics; a few of the 274 known species occur in the Neotropics and in Europe.

Genera
 Subfamily Archinycteribiinae Maa, 1975
 Archinycteribia Speiser, 1901
Subfamily Cyclopodiinae Maa, 1965
 Cyclopodia Kolenati, 1863
 Dipseliopoda Theodor, 1955
 Eucampsipoda Kolenati, 1857
 Leptocyclopodia Theodor, 1959
 Subfamily Nycteribiinae Westwood, 1835

 Basilia Miranda Ribeiro, 1903
 Hershkovitzia Guimarães & d'Andretta, 1956
 Nycteribia Latreille, 1796
 Penicillidia Kolenati, 1863
 Phthiridium Hermann, 1804
 Stereomyia Theodor, 1967
 Stylidia Westwood, 1840

Morphology
One of the key morphological features of Nycteribiidae is their highly reduced compound eyes. Many species of Nycteribiidae contain no visible eyes or contain only rudimentary eye spots. None of the species contain wings. They have backward folded legs that resemble those of spiders and a dorsally inserted head.

References

Further reading 

 HTML abstract

External links

 Diptera.info Images
 Nycteribiidae page at British Insects: Diptera Families (Contains links to illustrations)

 
Brachycera families
Parasites of bats
Taxa named by George Samouelle
Wingless Diptera